Janet McCloud (also known as Yet-Si-Blue; March 30, 1934 – November 25, 2003) was a prominent Native American and indigenous rights activist. Her activism helped lead to the 1974 Boldt Decision, for which she was dubbed "the Rosa Parks of the American Indian Movement." She co-founded Women of All Red Nations (WARN) in 1974. The first convening of the Indigenous Women's Network was in her backyard in Yelm, Washington in August 1985.

Ancestry and early life 
Janet Renecker (Yet-Si-Blue) was born on the Tulalip Reservation on March 30, 1934. She was the oldest of three girls and a descendant of Chief Seattle's family, and she lived a childhood marked by poverty and alcohol abuse.

Throughout her early years, she and her family moved often, from Tulalip to Taholah on the Quinault Reservation and, later, to Seattle's International District. Her stepfather drank and had trouble finding work.

She often took refuge in churches and foster homes, spending much of her formative years in the city—mainly out of touch with tribal customs and traditions.

"She thought taverns and drinking was the only way in life," Barbara McCloud, her daughter, said.

She married and divorced young before meeting a Nisqually tribal fisherman and electrical lineman named Don McCloud in the early 1950s. The couple soon married, and together would have eight children: six girls and two boys.

Fishing rights activism 
On January 6, 1962, dozens of Washington State game wardens stormed a group of Indians fishing the Nisqually River, arresting five men, including some of McCloud's relatives, for illegal fishing.

"When the raid ended after more than eight hours of sorties in wet brush and on the muddy, swollen stream, five Indians had been arrested and charged with `operating set nets capable of taking game fish.'"

Despite tribal treaties, such as the Treaty of Medicine Creek of 1854, with the federal government that guaranteed fishing and hunting rights to Indians in their traditional tribal lands and waters, state agents periodically squared off with Native Americans.

But as salmon and steelhead numbers began dwindling in the 1960s, the state began exerting more authority over tribal fisheries, attempting to conserve the catch for the commercial- and sport-fishing industries. Injunctions were issued allowing the state to regulate tribal fisheries, and the Washington State Supreme Court upheld them.

Indians began mobilizing. The McClouds founded the activist group Survival of American Indians Association. And, in defiance of court orders, members began staging demonstrations dubbed "fish-ins", the beginning of what would come to be known as the Fish Wars.

Joining her husband; his stepbrother, Nisqually tribal member Billy Frank, Jr.; Puyallup Indians Bob Satiacum and Ramona Bennett, and others, Janet McCloud helped organize the protests at the Nisqually River and Puyallup River, into which tribe members cast traditional nets deemed illegal by the state. Invariably, the "fish-ins" would lead to raids and arrests at the hands of game agents. But the events drew worldwide attention.

Indian elders and activists converged on Washington State. Actor Marlon Brando and rights activist Dick Gregory went to Western Washington, joined fish-ins and lent their celebrity to the cause. And the Black Panthers stood side-by-side with Indians in protests at the state Capitol in Olympia.

All the while, Janet McCloud documented the struggle as editor of Survival News, a newsletter that presented the natives' side of the fish wars. She found an old mimeograph machine at a local thrift store, brought it home and recruited her children to help.

"All us kids would be all right here, sorting and stapling all the papers together, late into the night," daughter Sally McCloud recalled.

Janet's children also stood on the battle lines.

During one famous fish-in at Frank's Landing on the Nisqually on Oct. 13, 1965, a boat carrying several native fishermen, including Janet's husband and two sons, set a tribal net in the river as game wardens lay in waiting. "From the other side of the river shouts were heard: 'Get em! Get the dirty S.O.B.s!'" McCloud wrote later. "In the twinkling of an eye, three big powerboats emerged from the underbrush, were quickly launched and used to ram the Indians' boat."

Her son, Jeff McCloud, not yet 10 and a non-swimmer, was dumped in. A scuffle broke out on the shore, where native women and children had gathered peacefully to watch the demonstration. They pelted wardens with debris, while game agents wrestled and beat some of the protesters.

"If Mom knew that was going to happen, she would've never brought us there," daughter Nancy Shippentower Games said. Six people were arrested, including Don and Janet McCloud. She served six days and refused to eat while incarcerated.

Eventually, the Indians' efforts paid off. On Feb. 12, 1974, U.S. District Judge George Boldt ruled in favor of 14 treaty tribes, upholding the language of their treaties that entitled them to half the salmon and steelhead catch in Washington.

Resurrecting Native American spirituality 
While McCloud has once been a practicing Catholic, the Fish Wars, along with catapulting her into the status of civil rights leader, also brought Janet McCloud in touch with her native spirituality. While her husband was jailed for a fish-in, McCloud experienced a vision at her Yelm home. "She couldn't rely on the white man's religion; it was hurting her," her daughter-in-law, Joyce McCloud, recalled. "That's when she saw the vision: She was looking out at Mount Rainier, and she saw all the faces of the great chiefs." McCloud believed it to be a calling. In the late 1960s, she met with Thomas Banyacya, an internationally known Hopi spiritual interpreter, who taught her to search for answers in peace. 

She befriended Audrey Shenandoah, an Iroquois Indian and Clan Mother of the Onondaga Nation in New York, and adopted Iroquois religious beliefs on nature.

"She was always speaking her mind, not backing down for anything," said Tracy Shenandoah, who with his mother came to Yelm to be with McCloud.

During the 1970s, McCloud spread the message of native spirituality and human rights worldwide. She traveled the globe, speaking about indigenous women's rights and social justice, and she served as delegate to a national conference on corrections, urging prisons to adopt native spirituality traditions for Indian inmates.

Sapa Dawn Center 
Janet McCloud established her home and the surrounding  in Yelm, Washington as a retreat, naming it the Sapa Dawn Center, "Sapa" meaning grandfather, the name a tribute to Don McCloud, who died in April 1985. "The elders have said this is a spiritual place. For over 30 years, we've used this land to teach our traditional ways," McCloud, an Indian elder herself, wrote in 1999. "When all is going crazy . . . our people can come back to the center to find the calming effect; to reconnect with their spiritual self."

Leaders of the American Indian Movement, Dennis Banks, Russell Means, and others, came to Sapa Dawn and its sweat lodge before launching their 1973 at Wounded Knee Occupation in South Dakota.

In August 1985, 300 Indigenous women gathered at Sapa Dawn to discuss social and economic issues faced by native families throughout the Western Hemisphere. This led to the formation of the  Indigenous Women's Network, a coalition championing native women, families and tribal sovereignty from Chile to Canada. McCloud was adopted as a founding mother. McCloud ensured that Sapa Dawn would bring its visitors closer to traditional ways of life. "There was no motel in Yelm then," recalls McCloud. "So we put up tepees. One woman said: 'Where's the motel?' I said, 'Here's a key: tepee number one or tepee number two.'"

Yet-Si-Blue 
Her uncle, Pete Henry, explained why McCloud's grandmother gave her the Indian name, "Yet-Si-Blue," meaning "the woman who talks." He remarked, "She had become a spokeswoman for Indian culture. That was the perfect name."

Death 
Bedridden and muted by complications from diabetes and high blood pressure in her final weeks, Janet McCloud died on November 25, 2003 at the age of 69, with her family gathered bedside, dressed in traditional garb by her granddaughters, and wrapped in a handmade quilt.

Notes 

20th-century Native Americans
Female Native American leaders
Native American activists
Native Americans' rights activists
Native American religion
Tulalip Tribes
2003 deaths
1934 births
20th-century American women
20th-century American people
20th-century Native American women
Women civil rights activists
21st-century American women